Loviisa sub-region  is a subdivision of Uusimaa and one of the Sub-regions of Finland since 2009.

Municipalities
 Lapinjärvi (Lappträsk)
 Loviisa (Lovisa)

Politics
Results of the 2018 Finnish presidential election:

 Sauli Niinistö   66.8%
 Pekka Haavisto   10.3%
 Laura Huhtasaari  5.4%
 Nils Torvalds     5.4%
 Paavo Väyrynen    4.8%
 Tuula Haatainen   3.5%
 Merja Kyllönen    1.9%
 Matti Vanhanen    1.9%

Sub-regions of Finland
Geography of Uusimaa